Punta Durnford is a cape in Western Sahara on the Atlantic Ocean, lying 6.7 km southwest of Dakhla.  It is the westernmost tip of the Río de Oro Peninsula.

Headlands of Africa
Landforms of Western Sahara